Elvedin Džinić (born 25 August 1985) is a Slovenian professional footballer who plays as a centre-back.

Club career
In 2005, he signed his first professional contract with NK Maribor. He played for the club between 2005 and 2010 and made a total of 140 appearances and scored 16 goals in the Slovenian PrvaLiga. In the 2009–10 season, he was voted by the fans as the most distinguished Maribor player.

On 10 January 2011, Džinić signed a contract with Belgian club Charleroi after refusing to renew his contract with Maribor, which would expire on 31 May 2011.

On 25 June 2013, Džinić signed a two-year contract with Botev Plovdiv in Bulgaria.

International career
Džinić was a member of the Slovenia national under-21 team, making one official appearance in September 2006. He was part of the senior squad at the 2010 FIFA World Cup. However, he was never capped for the national team.

References

External links
NZS profile 

1985 births
Living people
Sportspeople from Maribor
Slovenian footballers
Association football central defenders
Slovenia under-21 international footballers
2010 FIFA World Cup players
Slovenian PrvaLiga players
Slovenian Second League players
Belgian Pro League players
Challenger Pro League players
First Professional Football League (Bulgaria) players
Ekstraklasa players
NK Maribor players
NK Železničar Maribor players
R. Charleroi S.C. players
Botev Plovdiv players
Zagłębie Lubin players
NK Rudar Velenje players
NK Celje players
Slovenian expatriate footballers
Slovenian expatriate sportspeople in Belgium
Expatriate footballers in Belgium
Slovenian expatriate sportspeople in Bulgaria
Expatriate footballers in Bulgaria
Slovenian expatriate sportspeople in Poland
Expatriate footballers in Poland